Juan Crisóstomo Falcón Zavarce (27 January 1820 – 29 April 1870) was the president of Venezuela from 1863 to 1868.

Member of the liberal Venezuelan Federalist Party, he first served as president of Venezuela as the supreme chief of a rebel movement in August 1859, but the rebellion was soon crushed. He served as the recognized president of Venezuela from 1863 to 1868, when a conservative revolution headed by General José Tadeo Monagas ended his term as president. Also, he was briefly overthrown in 1865. At the end of his presidential term, Falcón emigrated to Europe. He died in Martinique in 1870.  The state of Falcón is named after him. 

In 1863, under the presidency of Juan Crisóstomo Falcon Zavarce, Venezuela became the first country to abolish capital punishment for all crimes, including serious offenses against the state.

Personal life
Falcón Zavarce was married to Luisa Isabel Pachano Muñoz, who served as First Lady of Venezuela from 1863 to 1868.

See also 
Ezequiel Zamora
Federal War
Battle of Santa Inés
Presidents of Venezuela 
List of Venezuelans

References

External links

 
Biography (Spanish)

People from Falcón
Presidents of Venezuela
People of the Federal War
Venezuelan soldiers
1820 births
1870 deaths
Venezuelan people of Spanish descent
Burials at the National Pantheon of Venezuela
Deaths from cancer in France